The 2010 MLS Expansion Draft took place on November 24, 2010, and was a special draft for the Major League Soccer expansion teams Vancouver Whitecaps FC and Portland Timbers.

Format
Source
 Portland Timbers selected first, Vancouver Whitecaps FC picked second, and the two alternated picks thereafter.
 Existing teams were allowed to protect 11 players from their rosters. Generation Adidas players were automatically protected, though players who graduated from the program to the senior roster at the end of the 2010 season were not.
 After each player was selected, his team was allowed to remove one exposed player from their list.
 Any developmental players selected were required to move up to the senior roster for the 2011 season.

Expansion Draft Results

Team-by-team breakdown

Source

Chicago Fire

Chivas USA

Colorado Rapids

Columbus Crew

D.C. United

FC Dallas

Houston Dynamo

Los Angeles Galaxy

New England Revolution

New York Red Bulls

Philadelphia Union

Real Salt Lake

San Jose Earthquakes

Seattle Sounders FC

Sporting Kansas City

Toronto FC

Major League Soccer Expansion Draft
Expansion Draft
MLS Expansion Draft